Nišville (Serbian: Нишвил, Nišvil) is an annual summer music festival held in the Ancient Fortress of Niš, Serbia.

From the festival's very beginning, its concept has been based on presenting the ‘traditional’ jazz forms together with their fusion with the ethnic tradition from the different parts of the world, especially from the Balkans.

History

The jazz festival tradition in Niš, initiated in 1981, and terminated in 1991, was renewed at the end of 1994 thanks to the producer and economist who specializes in cultural management, Ivan Blagojević, theatre director by vocation. The first manifestation, entitled "International Nišville Jazz Festival" was held in January 1995. From the very beginning, in addition to the "more traditional" forms of jazz, the concept of the festival has primarily been founded on the fusion of this genre with ethnic traditions of various parts of the world, especially the Balkans, and the venue, with the exception of two editions, (owing to space rental issues) was the large hall of "Klub Vojske" (Army Club), with the capacity of 800 seats.

Ever since the start, the Festival has established cooperation with cultural centers and embassies of the United States of America, the Netherlands, France, Norway, Germany, whose musicians have significantly participated at this manifestation and the names of the participants increasingly became greater: Reggie Workmen, Jimmy Cobb, Philip Catherine, Aria Hendricks, Miles Griffith, Denise Jannah, Bemshie Shearer etc. Based on the ideas of Ivan Blagojević, Nišville has frequently had programs involving different musicians (who had often not been acquainted with one another by that time) forming the same bands, including the performance by Šaban Bajramović with jazz musicians from Serbia, Bulgaria and Germany, followed by the "ad hoc" ensemble whose main lineup was made up of musicians from the "triangle" of Serbia – Bulgaria – Macedonia: Vasil Hadžimanov, Teodosi Spasov and Toni Kitanovski (band which continued working after Nišville), and a special exclusive involved the only joint performance by the Queen and King of Romani music – Esma Redžepova and Šaban Bajramović.

In addition to the large hall of the "Army Club", the Programs at the "Army Club" (which included a minimum of five bands per night of the festival) were also held on another stage (while the main stage was being prepared for the next band), in the hall of the Club, and the socializing between the audience and the musicians continued up to the early morning at jam sessions in Nišville Jazz Club.

The last edition in a closed area (and the late November term) proved that Nišville had fully completed their mission, as it had created (and, to a certain extent, educated) a very large audience, so the largest concert hall in Nis became too small to house all the interested parties, which was reflected in the fact that there was a lot of standing in a great number of programs, i.e. that the festival might have been attended by more than a thousand people per night.

The final edition in the hall of the Army Club was held in 2005, after which it was decided that the festival was to change the venue and the term. The fact that this was the right move was confirmed the following year and the first edition (mid-August) in one of the most beautiful, most acoustic and largest open amphitheaters in Europe – at the Summer stage in the Fortress of Nis, which practically initiated the new phase and the chronology of jazz events not only in the south of Serbia but also in this part of Europe.

The fact that there were (at least) three thousand visitors every night (which is the capacity of the venue) was simultaneously a practical confirmation of an "esthetic – physical" principle that the "jazz audience broadens according to the available space". The greater area enabled bringing even greater names, some of which included the following in the previous editions, from 2006 to 2008: Billy Cobham, Dr Donald Byrd, Incognito, The Brand New Heavies, Larry Coryell, Victor Bailey, Lenny White, Milčo Leviev, Nils Petter Molvaer, Duško Gojković, Rosenberg Trio, Gilles Peterson, Sidsel Endresen, Misterija bugarskih glasova etc. and Nišville practically immediately became the most frequently visited jazz festival in this part of Europe. Since 2009, Nišville has moved to the large empty grass plateau, also in the Fortress – where the complete structure is built and installed for each separate edition: stands for the audience, backstage, entrances etc.). In addition, there are two large stages, one beside the other, which include alternating performances (with the maximum reduction of breaks between performances) of the participants of the main program (six or seven per night). In addition to the main stage, the program is located on several other free stages at different points in the Fortress or Nis (Open Stage, Welcome Stage, Midnight Jam Stage), and by tradition, over the last few years, as a special introduction to the main program, a two-day and single-day free program entitled "Friends to Šaban" – a special homage to the King of Romani Music – has been held in the amphitheater at the quay next to the river Nišava – where the monument to Šaban Bajramović is located – erected at the initiative of Nišville Jazz Festival itself.

Nišville Festival has been visited by a great number of music lovers from the whole Serbia, neighboring countries, as well as the countries of Western Europe. The festival offered the package "Jazz Summer for 90 Euros" (accommodation with three meals per day and a set of tickets for all four festival nights), and one of the permanent segments of the festival is the free Nišville workshop – chat meetings, where almost all the participants of the main program, including the headliners of the festival, appeared as lecturers. Apart from the fact that the workshop is free – the candidates also obtained free passes for the main program. On average, every year, there are about 100 applicants for the workshop from all over Serbia and abroad, and a considerable number of candidates from previous years have already reached the status of participants of the supporting, and even the main program. One of the indicators of the success of Nišville is the fact that, over the last ten years, a significant number of talented young musicians appeared in Niš, i.e. a significant number of new jazz, blues and world music ensembles. What is more, in the follow-up programs, in addition to the already established Serbian (as well as foreign) bands, opportunities have been given to many bands from practically every part of Serbia (Zaječar, Čačak, Jagodina, Subotica, Sombor, Vranje, Leskovac etc.) which has been a great incentive to these bands to resume their work, as well as a confirmation that the existence of high quality bands is not solely a privilege of Belgrade, but of Niš or Novi Sad as well.

Nišville Jazz Festival records all programs as part of their own production – and the recordings are provided to all the participants (of course, without any compensation), which many bands have found to be their practically first opportunity to reach the professional recordings of their performances, which was later very significant as a reference in their contacts with other organizers. Among others, it was owing to the recordings from Nišville (main program) that the Nis Band "Eyot" succeeded in reaching relevant festivals and concert podiums (Jazz Fest Dubai, Jazzy Colors in Paris, Midem in Cannes, tours in Russia and the Far East etc.). 
In addition to the "orthodox" i.e. mainstream jazz, the concept of the selection of participants (whatever this has meant over the last decades!) has been to present the audience with more commercial programs which lie on the margins on jazz, i.e. represent a type of fusions of different genres and jazz (soul, blues, rhythm and blues, world music, electronic music etc.), and the Grand Prix of the festival bears the name of Šaban Bajramović and is awarded for the fusion of jazz and other music styles. Over time, such a concept has shown to be a hit, as the greater part of the audience, especially younger people, have been attracted by great names such as Candy Dulfer, Osibisa, Incognito, Brand New Heavies, De Phazz, Nouvelle Vague or Jazzanova, and has had the opportunity to hear legends such as Jean Luc Ponty, John Patittuci, Benny Golson, Randy Brecker, Miroslav Vitous, Ron Carter, Roy Hargrove, Tom Harrell etc. so the previously mentioned audience, as a rule, comes to all the following editions solely for the music of the greatest aesthetical level. 
      
As part of the action "Nišville in the Region", over the last few years, Nišville has organized (free) visits of the participants of the festival to many cities of Serbia (Dimitrovgrad, Vranje, Paraćin, Zaječar, Kruševac, Aranđelovac, Beograd, Novi Sad and Subotica, Aleksinac, Propkuplje etc.). Even before the official establishment of the Euro Region Niš – Sofia – Skoplje, the festival had had full-evening guest performances in the capitals of the neighboring countries ("Nišville in Sofia" in the National Castle of Culture and "Nišville in Skoplje" in the Universal Hall), and at the end of 1998, a similar program was also organized in the hall of the Faculty of Philology in Pristina.
To date, Nišville has published approximately twenty promotional audio and DVD discs "The Best of Nisville", which contained, in the form of one or several tracks, parts of the performances of almost all the participants – by which the festival not only greatly contributed to the jazz discography of this part of Europe, but also preserved for history (future audience and musicologists) significant documents, especially when it comes to the musical fusion of jazz and ethno music from different regions.

Based on estimates, over 6.000 musicians have performed at Nišville Jazz festival, and their concerts have probably been attended by more than 500,000 visitors. 
Ever since the move to the plateau in the Fortress, the following have been among those who performed at Nisville: Solomon Burke, Joss Stone, Jean Luc Ponty Quartet, Osibisa, Maria Joao, Brussels Jazz Orchestra, John Patittuci, Lollo Meier, Opus 5, Kim Clark & Joe Bowie, Lydian Sound Orchestra, Richard Galliano, Hans and Candy Dulfer, Benny Golson, Mingus Dynasty, Sly & Robbie ft. Junior Reid, Chico Freeman, Milcho Leviev, Stanley Jordan, Mungo Jerry Blues Band, Rick Margitza, Tom Harrell, Randy Brecker, Miroslav Vitous, Grace Kelly, Jamie Davis, Incognito, Kyle Eastwood, Hubert Tubbs, Ginger Baker Jazz Confusion ft. Pee Wee Ellis, Jazzanova, Ron Carter Golden Striker Trio ft. Russel Malone, Nouvelle Vague, Marius Neset, Joe Bowie, Roy Hargrove, De Phazz, The Brand New Heavies, Georgie Fame, Terje Rypdal, Manu Dibango, Yehia Khalil etc.
	 
Stjepko Gut used the name of the festival – Nišville as the title of one of his songs and the whole album was published in the USA (with a big band whose leader was legendary drummer Alvin Queen) during the nineties of the previous century. Furthermore, in 2008, Duško Gojković dedicated to the festival the score "Nišville Jubilation", which was first performed at Nišville in 2008. These two artists are highly renowned in the world – and are among the winners of the "Nišville Lifetime Achievement Award", which the festival awards each year to important jazz musicians from Serbia.

Every year, Nišville is followed by over 300 accredited journalists from Serbia and abroad, and among them, there are representatives of renowned music and political magazines. For example, in his portrayal of Nišville, the critic from the most famous jazz magazine, "Downbeat", paid special attention to some of the participants at the festival from Serbia, i.e. from the Balkans, while the reporter from the unofficial media of the European Union, the Brussels magazine "New Europe", headlined the text on the festival (announced on the front page), as "Nišville – the European Face of Serbia"!

References

External links

Music festivals in Serbia
Jazz festivals in Serbia
Music in Niš
Music festivals established in 1981
Folk festivals in Serbia
Summer events in Serbia
Music festivals in Yugoslavia
1981 establishments in Yugoslavia